(Eight Months in Two Hours or The Exiles in Siberia) is an opera in three acts by Gaetano Donizetti to a libretto by Domenico Gilardoni.

The original story comes from the 1806 novel, Elisabeth, ou Les exilés de Sibérie (Elisabeth, or the Exiles of Siberia), written by Sophie Ristaud Cottin. Luigi Marchionni's subsequent play, La figlia dell’esiliato, ossia Otto mesi in due ore (The Daughter of the Exile, or Eight Months in Two Hours), first performed in Italy in 1820, was the more immediate basis for Gilardoni's libretto.

The opera has two later, substantially re-worked versions, Élisabeth ou la fille de l'exilé (Elisabeth, or the daughter of the exile), and Elisabetta, both of which received their first performances some 150 years after Donizetti's death.

Performance history

19th century

The opera underwent many revisions and changes of title over the years, with a performance history nearly as convoluted as its plot. Its first version premiered with the title Otto mesi in due ore at the Teatro Nuovo in Naples on 13 May 1827, and was performed 50 times in its first season. In 1831, it was presented in Florence by Luigi Astolfi to only limited success as Gli esiliati in Siberia. In 1832, Donizetti revised the opera somewhat, adapting the original soprano role of Elisabetta for the popular Austro-Hungarian contralto, Caroline Ungher. He revised the opera further for its premiere in Livorno in 1833.

Between 1838 and 1840 Donizetti substantially re-worked the opera again, adding new music, for a longer version, Élisabeth ou la fille de l'exilé which was intended for performance in Paris. The new French libretto was written by Adolphe de Leuven and Léon-Lévy Brunswick. The American musicologist Will Crutchfield has suggested that by this point, it had now a become virtually a separate opera from Otto mesi in due ore, although clearly retaining many elements of the original. However, the new work was never staged in Donizetti's lifetime. Donizetti subsequently offered the Italian version, Elisabetta, to Her Majesty's Theatre in London. Likewise, this version was never performed in his lifetime.

The Italian composer , who claimed to have been a pupil of Donizetti, attempted to resurrect the French version after Donizetti's death. However, according to Will Crutchfield , Fontana did not have access to Donizetti's revised score, which by this time had ended up in London. Instead, he tried to set the original score of Otto mesi to the longer De Leuven and Brunswick libretto and composed the missing music (over half the opera) himself. The Fontana version premiered at the Théâtre Lyrique in Paris in 1853.

20th century and beyond

The long forgotten score for Elisabetta was later found in the basement of London's Royal Opera House. Acts 1 and 3 were found by Will Crutchfield in 1984, and Act 2 by Richard Bonynge in 1988. It received its first performance, with the score edited by Will Crutchfield and Roger Parker, at the Royal Festival Hall in London on 16 December 1997. Carlo Rizzi conducted the Royal Opera House Orchestra and Chorus in a concert performance with Andrea Rost singing the role of Elisabetta, and the young Juan Diego Flórez as Count Potoski.

The first performance of the 1840 French version, Élisabeth ou la fille de l'exilé, using only Donizetti's music, took place at the Caramoor International Music Festival on 17 July 2003.
Will Crutchfield conducted the Orchestra of St. Luke's in a semi-staged production. Irini Tsirakidis sang the role of Élisabeth, and Yeghishe Manucharyan was Count Potoski. To prepare the Caramoor performing edition, Crutchfield worked with the French manuscript, using the orchestration from the London version, and the original score of Otto mesi in due ore to construct the final aria. The recitatives from Elisabetta were adapted to spoken dialogue as the French version was intended to be an opéra comique.

Roles

Synopsis

Act 1
Saimika, Siberia

Having been wrongly exiled, Count Stanislao Potoski, his wife, Countess Fedora, and their daughter, Elisabetta, are living in a ramshackle dwelling attached to an abbey. Elisabetta vows to undertake an arduous journey on foot to Moscow to seek a pardon from the Tsar.

Act 2
The shores of the Kama River

Elisabetta is befriended by Tartar hordes, who had initially threatened her but were won over by her innocence and virtue. She also meets Ivano, the man responsible for her parents' exile, who is now working as a ferryman at the river. When the river floods, Elisabetta saves herself by making a raft from the wooden tomb of Ivano's dead daughter.

Act 3
A grand chamber in the Kremlin

The Grand Marshal, who is also partly responsible for the Potoski family's exile, tries to cause trouble for Elisabetta. Nevertheless, she manages to reach the Tsar, who in the meantime has received a letter from his messenger Michele (a friend of Elisabetta and the son of her nurse) explaining the injustice of their exile. The Tsar pardons the whole family who are then reunited in Moscow.

Recordings
As Otto mesi 

As Elisabetta

References
Notes

Cited sources

Canning, Hugh, "Replacement value", The Sunday Times (London), 21 December 1997. Accessed 25 June 2011
Lamb, Gregory M., "Lost and Found", The Christian Science Monitor, 27 June 2003. Accessed 25 June 2011
Milnes, Rodney, "Bizarre – but seldom boring", The Times (London), 18 December 1997. Reprinted on jcarreras.homestead.com.  Accessed 25 June 2011
Porter, Andrew,  "Return of the exile", The Times (London)], 2 January 1998. Accessed 25 June 2011
Rosenberg, Marion Lignana,  "Donizetti's Elisabeth at Caramoor", Opera News, October 2003, on mondo-marion.com. Accessed 25 June 2011
Tommasini, Anthony, "A Donizetti Discovery, Reinterpreted", The New York Times, 19 July 2003. Accessed 25 June 2011

Other sources
Ashbrook, William (1982), Donizetti and His Operas, Cambridge University Press.  
Allitt, John Stewart (1991), Donizetti: in the light of Romanticism and the teaching of Johann Simon Mayr, Shaftesbury: Element Books, Ltd (UK); Rockport, MA: Element, Inc.(USA)
Ashbrook, William (1998), "Donizetti, Gaetano" in Stanley Sadie (Ed.),  The New Grove Dictionary of Opera, Vol. One. London: MacMillan Publishers, Inc.   
Ashbrook, William and Sarah Hibberd (2001), in Holden, Amanda (Ed.), The New Penguin Opera Guide, New York: Penguin Putnam. .  pp. 224 – 247.
Black, John (1982), Donizetti’s Operas in Naples, 1822–1848. London: The Donizetti Society.
Crutchfield, Will,  "Donizetti's Élisabeth, ou la fille de l'exilé, on donizettisociety.com, The Donizetti Society'''s website. (This article discusses in detail the significant differences between Élisabeth, ou la fille de l'exilé and Otto mesi in due ore, as well as the process of reconstructing the score.) Accessed 25 June 2011.
Levine, Robert, Review of the Actes Sud recording of Gli esiliati in Siberia on classicstoday.com. Accessed 25 June 2011
Loewenberg, Alfred (1970). Annals of Opera, 1597–1940, 2nd edition.  Rowman and Littlefield
Osborne, Charles, (1994),  The Bel Canto Operas of Rossini, Donizetti, and Bellini, Portland, Oregon: Amadeus Press. 
Sadie, Stanley, (Ed.); John Tyrell (Exec. Ed.) (2004), The New Grove Dictionary of Music and Musicians.  2nd edition. London: Macmillan.    (hardcover).   (eBook).
Unk., "Lost" Donizetti opera scored by Music Faculty", The Oxford University Gazette, 11 December 1997. (A brief account of how the score for the 1997 London performance of Elisabetta was assembled and edited.) Accessed 25 June 2011
 Weinstock, Herbert (1963), Donizetti and the World of Opera in Italy, Paris, and Vienna in the First Half of the Nineteenth Century'', New York: Pantheon Books.

External links
  Donizetti Society (London) website as source for further information.
 "Role creators in the Donizetti operas" on opera.stanford.edu. Accessed 26 June 2011

Operas by Gaetano Donizetti
Italian-language operas
Operas
1827 operas
Operas based on novels
Operas set in Russia
Operas based on plays